Law enforcement is an integral part of the HBO drama series The Wire. The show has numerous characters in this field and their roles range from those enforcing the law at street level up to those setting laws citywide. The Baltimore City Police Department has been explored in detail from street level characters to the upper echelons of command. The show has also examined those setting laws in city politics and touched upon the FBI, the correctional system and the family of police officers.

Police

The police department includes several of the show's starring characters and a wealth of supporting characters. It has been featured in all 5 seasons of the show to date.

FBI

Terrance "Fitz" Fitzhugh

Played by: Doug Olear 
Appears in 
Season 1: "The Target"; "The Buys" and "Sentencing".
Season 2: "Stray Rounds"; "Storm Warnings"; "Bad Dreams" and "Port in a Storm".
Season 3: "Moral Midgetry"; "Slapstick"; and "Middle Ground".
Season 5: "Unconfirmed Reports"; "Clarifications"; and "–30–."
Fitz is a special agent with the FBI and a friend of Jimmy McNulty's. Fitz inspires McNulty to use modern electronic surveillance against the Barksdale Organization, by showing how they set up video surveillance on a drug production ring. He tells McNulty it would be the last major Bureau drug investigation in Baltimore, because the FBI is shifting resources to counter-terrorism. Fitz helps McNulty again by giving him some of the FBI's less bulky recording devices. He also warns McNulty that his commander Cedric Daniels was investigated for corruption by the FBI and they had found he had an excess of liquid assets. After they handed Daniels' case over to Deputy Commissioner Ervin Burrell, nothing further came of it.

Fitz also becomes involved with McNulty's team's case against Frank Sobotka. Major Valchek calls in the FBI when he feels the case had strayed too far from Sobotka. The FBI has a particular interest in corrupt unions and quickly go after the Dockworkers' Local.  Fitz actively works with the Major Crimes squad to place surveillance on the Greek's lieutenants and gaining access to previous phone conversations in their network. When a leak within the FBI seriously damages the case, Fitz realizes who it was and breaks the news to Lieutenant Daniels.

In the season 3, Fitz supplies the Major Crimes Unit with photo-enhancing technology that they use to check number plates on Barksdale Organization vehicles.  McNulty also asks Fitz for any equipment which the FBI is not currently using, only for Fitz to happily inform him that the Police department had been given said equipment as part of a counter - terrorism federal grant leading McNulty to find them collecting dust in Police storage.   Fitz is then called on for a final favor from Daniels: an immediate wiretap on Stringer Bell, as time is limited in retrieving cell phone information from him. Fitz then goes to the FBI, changing Bell's original name from Russell to Achmed, claiming Bell has ties to terrorist organizations, giving Daniel's unit an immediate surveillance of Bell.

In season 5 Fitz is approached by McNulty and Freeman about the FBI taking over the Marlo Stanfield case as they would have the resources to carry out the investigations.  Fitz is able to put the case before his superiors and argue that it is feasible, however the person reviewing the case is the Attorney General who Carcetti refused to co - operate with in pursuing federal charges against corrupt Senator Clay Davis.  The result is that the case is essentially blacklisted by most agencies including the FBI to avoid any potential backlash from the Attorney General.  Fitz apologetically tells McNulty that he will have to bring in Marlo on his own as no other law enforcement agency will want to face the political headache from the Attorney General. 

Fitz is based on a real FBI agent named Jake Fitzsimmons, who collaborated on cases with writer and ex-detective Ed Burns.  Burns is a University of Toledo College of Law alumnus, and Fitz mentions his Rockets allegiance in season 3, when joking around with McNulty.

Amanda Reese

Played by: Benay Berger 
Appears in 
Season 1: "Sentencing".
Season 2: "Storm Warnings"; "Bad Dreams" and "Port in a Storm".
Season 3: "Slapstick".
Season 5: "Unconfirmed Reports"; "Clarifications"; and "–30–."
Reese is a Baltimore division FBI supervisor and Fitz's superior. She often works with Lieutenant Daniels, supplying him with resources and running joint cases. She is approached with the Barksdale case to discuss pursuing a corruption angle, but Daniels decides that is not the direction he wants. Her team also works alongside Daniels' detail investigating union corruption in the Baltimore ports. Her goal during the investigation is getting the union decertified unless they change their leadership wholesale.

Kristos Koutris

Played by: Tom Mardirosian
Appears in season two: "Stray Rounds"; "Storm Warnings" and "Bad Dreams".
Koutris is a special agent in the FBI's counter-terrorism unit who feeds information on the bureau’s activity to The Greek. He is responsible for telling The Greek about an investigation by the Baltimore Police Department and the local FBI office, and gives The Greek warning enough to temporarily shut down his smuggling operation. He is rewarded with information on a large shipment of drugs that he seizes on the FBI’s behalf. 

Koutris is also responsible for telling The Greek that his contact in the Port of Baltimore, Frank Sobotka, has agreed to give evidence against him. This information leads to Sobotka’s death. FBI Special Agent Fitzhugh realizes Koutris is a leak, but is unable to do anything because Koutris is well regarded because of the drug arrest. It is also implied (and has subsequently been confirmed by creator David Simon) that Koutris is protecting The Greek by supplying him with confidential FBI information in exchange for information on potential acts of terrorism, or with tip-offs to other illegal activities (such as the Colombian drug importation). 

Per a review of the Season 2 finale by Alan Sepinwall, Simon confirmed that Koutris was never corrupt, but had done a calculation that the intel that The Greek gave to him had greater positive value than the negative costs of leaving The Greek free to commit other crimes.

Court house

Rupert Bond

Played by: Dion Graham
Appears in: 
Season 4: "Unto Others", "Know Your Place", "That's Got His Own".
Season 5: "More with Less", "Transitions", "React Quotes", "The Dickensian Aspect", "Took", and "–30–".
Rupert Bond is a politically ambitious African American prosecuting attorney. In season 4, he is campaigning against incumbent Steven Demper to become the Maryland State's Attorney for Baltimore City. Demper is supported by Mayor Royce. Bond maintains a lead against Demper throughout the campaign and is initially viewed with skepticism by Rhonda Pearlman. She claims that if Demper loses, the new front office will demote her because of her race in majority African American Baltimore. Royce and Demper both lose in the election, and Bond is elected State's Attorney. Bond promotes both Ilene Nathan and Pearlman (both of whom are white),  whom he admires as good prosecutors. In a meeting with newly elected Mayor Tommy Carcetti, Bond is opposed to legalizing gambling in Baltimore due to the crime increase that comes with casinos.

In season 5, Bond is focused on convicting the corrupt Maryland State Senator Clay Davis. Bond  convinces Carcetti to grant him a small police detail to pursue the case when the Major Crimes Unit is closed down due to funding cuts. City Council President Nerese Campbell believes Bond is interested in the high-profile conviction in order to raise his profile and believes Bond will contest her run to replace Carcetti as mayor of Baltimore. Carcetti backs Bond's desire to keep the case local out of fear that the Republican federal prosecutor will use the case to create a scandal for Carcetti's own Democratic Party.

New developments in the Davis investigation provide an opportunity to take the case federal, but Bond elects to ignore the potential for a new, federal charge to keep the case as his own. Bond has Pearlman bring Davis in for a Grand Jury deposition and stages a photo opportunity as Davis leaves the courthouse. Clay Davis turns the tables during the trial rallying Baltimore's African American community with the support of influential figures such as high-profile attorney Billy Murphy and former mayor Clarence Royce.

As Davis is called to the stand, he mockingly refers to Bond as "Prosecutor Obonda" (Most likely in reference to Barack Obama, who at the time of filming had only recently commenced his campaign for president and had not yet won any primaries). He charms the majority African American jury into believing that all of the questionable income he has allegedly collected has been sent back to help solve various community problems. Davis is then found not guilty, after which follows a celebration outside the courthouse to the shock of Bond and Pearlman.

Nadiva Bryant

Played by: Toni Lewis
Appears in: 
Season one: "Sentencing".
Season two: "Bad Dreams" and "Storm Warnings".
Nadiva Bryant is an Assistant United States Attorney and works as the federal prosecutor for the team of FBI Agents led by Amanda Reese. She first appears when the Barksdale detail try to take their case federal in season one. She returns when the Sobotka detail case becomes a federal investigation.

Steven Demper

Played by: Doug Roberts
Appears in: 
Season one: "Cleaning Up". 
Season three: "Dead Soldiers", "Mission Accomplished". 
Season four: "Home Rooms".
Demper is a Maryland State's Attorney, serving the district that includes Baltimore. He is the boss of Assistant State's Attorneys Rhonda Pearlman and Ilene Nathan. Demper is widely regarded as being more interested in preserving his elected position than pursuing justice. Pearlman falls out of his favor when a detail she is working with begins to investigate campaign donations made by drug dealers. 

He is later criticized by Ervin Burrell for refusing to chance a "whodunit" case as a means of helping the police department make convictions that stick. Delegate Odell Watkins is dissatisfied with Demper but Mayor Clarence Royce won't replace him due to his loyalty.  In season four, Royce threatens to drop him from the party ticket if Demper does not go along with Royce's plans to interfere with the Carcetti campaign. Demper loses his bid for re-election to African American candidate Rupert Bond.

Ilene Nathan

Played by: Susan Rome 
Appears in: 
Season one: "The Hunt" and Sentencing".
Season two: "Undertow" and All Prologue".
Season three: "Dead Soldiers" (uncredited)
Season four: "Unto Others"; "Corner Boys" (uncredited).
Nathan is an Assistant State's Attorney in Baltimore and colleague of Rhonda Pearlman. Initially, she was the head of the violent crimes unit, tasked with prosecuting homicides in the city. As such, she convinced Wee-Bey Brice to plead guilty to multiple murders to avoid the death penalty, and was also present when Savino Bratton confessed to an (albeit minor) role in the shooting of Detective Greggs.

In season two, Nathan conducted the prosecution against "Bird" Hilton, reluctantly using Omar Little as a witness. Once Bird was found guilty, she promised Omar a free pass on any single minor charge in the future for his assistance. She appeared only briefly in season three, attending the wake of Detective Ray Cole. When Omar was framed for a murder and arrested in season four, he convinced Detective Bunk Moreland that he was innocent and Bunk in turn convinced Nathan to have Omar transferred to a safer prison. Nathan told Bunk that she now considered her debt to Omar repaid.

Later in season four, Nathan helped Detectives Greggs and Norris investigate the Braddock murder case. She also attended the wake of CID and homicide unit commander Raymond Foerster. When Rupert Bond was elected State's attorney he promoted Nathan to second deputy State's Attorney and Pearlman took over her role in the violent crimes unit.

Rhonda Pearlman

Assistant Maryland State's Attorney Pearlman has been the legal system liaison for all the major investigations on the show.

Daniel Phelan

Played by: Peter Gerety
Appears in: 
Season one: "The Target"; "The Detail"; "Old Cases"; "The Pager"; "One Arrest"; "Lessons"; "The Cost"; "The Hunt"; "Sentencing". 
Season two: "All Prologue".
Season three: "Reformation" and "Middle Ground".
Season five: "The Dickensian Aspect", "Took", and "–30–".
Judge Phelan is a friend of Detective Jimmy McNulty's who presides over the D'Angelo Barksdale murder trial, watching the jury give a not guilty verdict when a witness changes her statement. After he learns the witness was paid off (and possibly intimidated), and that D'Angelo is part of a much larger drug dealing operation, Phelan insists that Police Deputy Commissioner Ervin Burrell set up a detail to investigate. 

Over the course of the investigation, he remains willing to sign court documents authorizing wiretaps. When Phelan realizes his actions have cost him political capital, his passion for the case wanes, which sours his relationship with McNulty. Assistant States Attorney Rhonda Pearlman uses Phelan's obvious attraction to her to keep him interested in the case.

In Season two, Phelan presides over the trial of Marquis "Bird" Hilton for the murder of Gant, during which he is amused by Omar Little's testimony, and pleased to give Bird a strict sentence.

Gary DiPasquale

Played by: Gary D'Addario
Appears in: 
Season two: "Undertow".
Season four: "Corner Boys"; and "Final Grades".
Season five: "Not for Attribution"; and "–30–".
Gary DiPasquale is an Assistant State's Attorney and serves as the Grand Jury Prosecutor. DiPasquale is an associate of Bunk Moreland who assists the police in various Homicide cases. The Grand Jury first appear in an unsuccessful summons of Frank Sobotka's union in connection with the investigation of the deaths of thirteen Jane Does found DOA in a shipping container. DiPasquale then appears in Season 4 involving a summons of Old Face Andre with a perjury threat and with a court order to obtain DNA evidence from Stanfield Organization enforcers "Snoop" Pearson and Chris Partlow. In Season 5, DiPasquale is prominent in obtaining depositions for the Clay Davis trial.

DiPasquale is later revealed to be responsible for selling sealed grand jury indictments to defense attorneys including Maurice Levy. Detective Lester Freamon concludes that DiPasquale is selling the indictments because amongst those working in the courthouse, DiPasquale's finances show that he took out a third mortgage on his home and has annual gambling losses that are more than three times his salary. Freamon convinces DiPasquale to cooperate as an informant, and has DiPasquale incriminate Levy in a single party consent telephone conversation. DiPasquale's actions are later covered up as part of a deal between Levy and prosecutor Rhonda Pearlman on charges against the Stanfield Organization.

The character is played by the series technical advisor Gary D'Addario, the shift lieutenant for the Baltimore Police Department's Homicide Unit featured in David Simon's Homicide: A Year on the Killing Streets book.

Politics

Prison staff

Dwight Tilghman

Played by: Antonio D. Charity
Appears in season two: "Collateral Damage" (uncredited); "Hot Shots" and "Hard Cases".
Tilghman is a corrections officer at Maryland Correctional Institute who secretly runs a side business smuggling drugs to the inmates. He harasses Wee-Bey Brice after Wee-Bey confesses to the murder of one of his relatives. Avon Barksdale tries to negotiate a truce but Tilghman refuses, so Avon and Stringer Bell conspire to get Tilghman out of the way. Stringer tracks down Tilghman's supplier, Blind Butchie, and pays him to give Tilghman tainted heroin, which kills five inmates and hospitalizes eight more. 

An investigation is launched and Avon snitches on Tilghman in exchange for an early parole hearing. When prison staff search Tilghman's car, they find drugs which Shamrock had subtly planted to corroborate Avon's "story", and Tilghman is arrested.

References

Lists of The Wire characters